Prince Qin of the Second Rank (勤郡王) was a Qing dynasty princely peerage. The peerage was created in 1684 for Yunduan, Nurhaci's great-grandson and son of Prince An of the Second Rank Yolo. As Prince Qin of the Second Rank peerage was not given iron-cap status, each successive bearer of the title would hold diminished ranks vis-a-vis his predecessor.

Members of Prince Qin peerage 

 1684－1698: Yunduan . He was granted a title of Prince of the Second Rank under the name "Qin". In 1690, he was demoted to prince of the Fourth Rank and stripped of his titles in 1698.

Family tree

References 

Prince Qin
Extinct Qing dynasty princely peerages